This is a list of the National Register of Historic Places listings in Guadalupe County, Texas.

This is intended to be a complete list of properties and districts listed on the National Register of Historic Places in Guadalupe County, Texas. There are two districts and 12 individual properties listed on the National Register in the county. Two individually listed properties are State Antiquities Landmarks including one along with five other properties that are designated Recorded Texas Historic Landmarks. One district includes an additional Recorded Texas Historic Landmark.

Current listings

The publicly disclosed locations of National Register properties and districts may be seen in a mapping service provided.

|}

See also

National Register of Historic Places listings in Texas
Recorded Texas Historic Landmarks in Guadalupe County

References

External links

Registered Historic Places
Guadalupe County
Buildings and structures in Guadalupe County, Texas